The Shwethalyaung Temple (  is a Buddhist temple in the west side of Bago (Pegu), Myanmar.

Shwethalyaung Buddha statue
The Shwethalyaung Buddha is a reclining Buddha statue. It was lost in 1757 when Pegu was pillaged. During British colonial rule, in 1880, the Shwethalyaung Buddha was rediscovered under a cover of jungle growth. Restoration began in 1881, and Buddha's mosaic pillows (on its left side) were added in 1930.

Gallery

References 

Buddhist temples in Myanmar
10th-century Buddhist temples
Buildings and structures completed in the 10th century
994 establishments